William Dupree may refer to:
Sir William Dupree, 1st Baronet (1856–1933), English brewer
William Dupree (bobsleigh) (1909–1955), American bobsledder
William Jedediah Dupree (born 1979), American fencer

See also
Dupree (surname)